James Plemon Coleman (January 9, 1914 – September 28, 1991) was an American judge and the 52nd Governor of Mississippi and a United States circuit judge of the United States Court of Appeals for the Fifth Circuit.

Education and career

Born on January 9, 1914, in Ackerman, Mississippi, Coleman received a Bachelor of Laws in 1939 from the George Washington University Law School. He served upon the staff of Mississippi Congressman Aaron L. Ford. He entered private practice in Ackerman from 1939 to 1946. He concurrently served as district attorney for the Fifth Judicial District of Mississippi from 1940 to 1946. He was a Judge of the Mississippi Circuit Court for the Fifth Judicial District from 1947 to 1950. He was a justice of the Mississippi Supreme Court in 1950. He was Mississippi Attorney General from 1950 to 1956. He was the 52nd Governor of Mississippi from 1956 to 1960. He was a Member of the Mississippi House of Representatives from 1960 to 1964. He was in private practice in Choctaw County, Mississippi from 1960 to 1965.

Little Congress

During his service with Congressman Ford, in Washington, D.C., Coleman made a name for himself by challenging and defeating another young southern congressional staffer, future President Lyndon B. Johnson, for Speaker of the Little Congress, a body that Johnson had dominated before Coleman's challenge. Coleman and Johnson became lifelong friends.

Gubernatorial service

Coleman became the Governor of Mississippi in 1956 as a moderate candidate in a campaign where he promised to uphold segregation. As Governor, he befriended Democratic presidential candidate, Senator John F. Kennedy, but set up the Mississippi State Sovereignty Commission. When Clennon Washington King, Jr. attempted to integrate the University of Mississippi, Coleman went to Oxford to prevent King's matriculation and fulfill his promise of segregation of all schools. He objected to being called a moderate by his critics, preferring to characterize himself as a "successful segregationist".

Unsuccessful gubernatorial campaign

In his subsequent campaign for governor in 1963, Coleman lost the Democratic nomination to Paul B. Johnson, Jr., a son of a former governor. Segregationist Johnson painted Coleman as a racial moderate and friend of the Kennedy administration. Paul Johnson's campaign staff charged that during the 1960 presidential campaign Coleman had allowed Kennedy to sleep in the Governor's Mansion in the bed formerly used by the late Governor and United States Senator Theodore Bilbo. Johnson went on to defeat the Democrat-turned-Republican Rubel Phillips in the 1963 general election, which presented Mississippi voters with a new-at-the-time opportunity to choose between candidates of different parties.

Federal judicial service

President Kennedy offered Coleman various posts, including United States Secretary of the Army and United States Ambassador to Australia, but Coleman declined.

Coleman was nominated by President Lyndon B. Johnson on June 22, 1965, to a seat on the United States Court of Appeals for the Fifth Circuit vacated by Judge Benjamin Franklin Cameron. Even though controversy erupted over his pro-segregation positions such as his opposition to Blacks voting, he was confirmed by the United States Senate on July 26, 1965, and received his commission on July 26, 1965.

He served as Chief Judge from 1979 to 1981. He assumed senior status on May 31, 1981. His service terminated on January 31, 1984, due to his retirement.

Post judicial service and death

After his retirement from the federal bench, Coleman returned to the private practice of law in Choctaw County and also farmed until he suffered a severe stroke on December 11, 1990. He died on September 28, 1991, in Ackerman.

Honor

J. P. Coleman State Park, a state park in Mississippi, is named after him.

Personal

Coleman's grandson, Josiah D. Coleman is a justice of the Mississippi Supreme Court.

References

External links
 Oral History Interview with James P. Coleman at Oral Histories of the American South
 

1914 births
1991 deaths
Democratic Party governors of Mississippi
Judges of the United States Court of Appeals for the Fifth Circuit
United States court of appeals judges appointed by Lyndon B. Johnson
20th-century American judges
Democratic Party members of the Mississippi House of Representatives
Justices of the Mississippi Supreme Court
George Washington University Law School alumni
Mississippi Attorneys General
20th-century American lawyers
People from Ackerman, Mississippi
20th-century American politicians
American white supremacists
American segregationists